Angelina Alonso Costantino (born 26 January 2000), commonly known as Angelina, is a Brazilian professional footballer who plays as a midfielder for National Women's Soccer League club OL Reign.

Club career
Angelina began her professional career in Brazil with Brasileiro Feminino club Santos. She made her debut for the club on 17 May 2017 against Ponte Preta, coming on as an 81st-minute substitute in a 2–0 victory. Angelina scored her first career goal for Santos on 24 April 2019 against Ponte Preta, which was the only goal in a 1–0 victory.

Prior to the 2020 season, Angelina joined Palmeiras, making her debut on 16 February 2020 against Ferroviária.

OL Reign
On 5 January 2021, Angelina moved to the United States and joined National Women's Soccer League club OL Reign. She made her debut for the club on 16 April 2021 in the NWSL Challenge Cup against the Houston Dash.

International career
Angelina has represented Brazil at the under-17 and under-20 level.

International goals

Career statistics

Club

Honors
 with OL Reign
 NWSL Shield: 2022
 The Women's Cup: 2022

Personal life 
Angelina was born in Jersey City, New Jersey, to Brazilian parents.

References

External links
 
 

2000 births
Living people
Brazilian women's footballers
Women's association football midfielders
Santos FC (women) players
OL Reign players
National Women's Soccer League players
Soccer players from New Jersey
Sportspeople from Jersey City, New Jersey
Sociedade Esportiva Palmeiras (women) players
Footballers at the 2020 Summer Olympics
Olympic footballers of Brazil
Brazil women's international footballers